Curtis Hunt (born January 28, 1967) is a Canadian former professional ice hockey player who currently serves as the General Manager for the Prince Albert Raiders of the Western Hockey League (WHL).

Playing career
Hunt played junior hockey for the Prince Albert Raiders in the WHL, winning a Memorial Cup in 1985.  He was drafted by the Vancouver Canucks in the 1985 NHL Entry Draft, but never played in the NHL. Hunt played in the American Hockey League for the Fredericton Express and St. John's Maple Leafs.  He also played in the International Hockey League (IHL) and the East Coast Hockey League.

Coaching career
Hunt started his coaching career in the IHL as an assistant coach with the Grand Rapids Griffins.  He then moved to the WHL, serving as head coach for the Moose Jaw Warriors and Regina Pats.  After the 2003–04 season with the Warriors, Hunt was the runner-up for WHL Coach of the Year.  Hunt made the jump to the National Hockey League coaching ranks, serving as an assistant coach for the Ottawa Senators during the 2008–09 season.  After head coach Craig Hartsburg was fired, Hunt was demoted to coach the Binghamton Senators of the AHL.  Hunt rejoined the Pats starting with the 2009–10 season.

Hunt has coached internationally for Canada at the junior level.  He served as an assistant coach on Canada's gold medal winning teams at the World Junior Ice Hockey Championships in 2006 and 2007.

During the 2014–15 season, Hunt was named the General Manager and Head coach for the Fort McMurray Oil Barons as a replacement for Gord Thibodeau. He resigned the following season after making multiple trades that left the Oil Barons organization scrambling to rebuild their roster in order to put a competitive team on the ice. He joined the Prince Albert Raiders shortly after his resignation. His new role as general manager was announced on June 8, 2015.

Career statistics

References

1967 births
Fredericton Express players
Ice hockey people from Saskatchewan
Living people
Moose Jaw Warriors coaches
Ottawa Senators coaches
Prince Albert Raiders players
Regina Pats coaches
Vancouver Canucks draft picks
Canadian ice hockey defencemen
Canadian ice hockey coaches